Diplycosia is a genus of flowering plants belonging to the family Ericaceae. Plants of the World Online now treats the genus as a synonym of Gaultheria.

Its native range is Indo-China to Papuasia.

Species:

Diplycosia abanii 
Diplycosia abscondita 
Diplycosia acuminata 
Diplycosia amboinensis 
Diplycosia annamensis 
Diplycosia aperta 
Diplycosia apiculifera 
Diplycosia apoensis 
Diplycosia atjehensis 
Diplycosia aurea 
Diplycosia balgooyi 
Diplycosia barbigera 
Diplycosia bartolomei 
Diplycosia benitotanii 
Diplycosia brachyantha 
Diplycosia capitata 
Diplycosia carrii 
Diplycosia caryophylloides 
Diplycosia caudatifolia 
Diplycosia celebensis 
Diplycosia chrysothrix 
Diplycosia ciliolata 
Diplycosia cinnabarina 
Diplycosia cinnamomifolia 
Diplycosia clementium 
Diplycosia coi 
Diplycosia commutata 
Diplycosia consobrina 
Diplycosia crenulata 
Diplycosia edulis 
Diplycosia ensifolia 
Diplycosia epiphytica 
Diplycosia filipes 
Diplycosia fimbriata 
Diplycosia gallowayana 
Diplycosia glaucicaulis 
Diplycosia glauciflora 
Diplycosia gracilipes 
Diplycosia haemantha 
Diplycosia hendrianiana 
Diplycosia heterophylla 
Diplycosia hirsuta 
Diplycosia hirtiflora 
Diplycosia kalimantanensis 
Diplycosia kalmiifolia 
Diplycosia kemulensis 
Diplycosia kinabaluensis 
Diplycosia kjellbergii 
Diplycosia kosteri 
Diplycosia kostermansii 
Diplycosia lamiij 
Diplycosia lancifolia 
Diplycosia lavandulifolia 
Diplycosia ledermannii 
Diplycosia lilianae 
Diplycosia lohieri 
Diplycosia lorentzii 
Diplycosia lotungensis 
Diplycosia luzonica 
Diplycosia lysolepis 
Diplycosia malayana 
Diplycosia mantorii 
Diplycosia megabracteata 
Diplycosia mekonggaensis 
Diplycosia memecyloides 
Diplycosia microphylla 
Diplycosia microsalicifolia 
Diplycosia minutiflora 
Diplycosia mogeana 
Diplycosia morobeensis 
Diplycosia muscicola 
Diplycosia myrtillus 
Diplycosia ngii 
Diplycosia orophila 
Diplycosia othmanii 
Diplycosia parvifolia 
Diplycosia paulsmithii 
Diplycosia pendens 
Diplycosia penduliflora 
Diplycosia piceifolia 
Diplycosia pilosa 
Diplycosia pinifolia 
Diplycosia pittosporifolia 
Diplycosia platyphylla 
Diplycosia pseudorufescens 
Diplycosia pubivertex 
Diplycosia punctulata 
Diplycosia puradyatmikai
Diplycosia retusa 
Diplycosia rhombica 
Diplycosia rigidifolia 
Diplycosia rosea 
Diplycosia rosmarinifolia 
Diplycosia rubella 
Diplycosia rubidiflora 
Diplycosia rufa 
Diplycosia rufescens 
Diplycosia rupicola 
Diplycosia sagittanthera 
Diplycosia salicifolia 
Diplycosia sanguinolenta 
Diplycosia saurauioides 
Diplycosia scabrida 
Diplycosia schramii 
Diplycosia schultzei 
Diplycosia setiloba 
Diplycosia setosa 
Diplycosia soror 
Diplycosia sphenophylla 
Diplycosia stellaris 
Diplycosia stenophylla 
Diplycosia subglobularis 
Diplycosia sumatrensis 
Diplycosia supyanii 
Diplycosia tetramera 
Diplycosia triangulanthera 
Diplycosia trinervia 
Diplycosia undata 
Diplycosia urceolata 
Diplycosia varians 
Diplycosia viridiflora

References

Ericaceae
Ericaceae genera